Magan Airport (Mağan aeroporda)  serves the village of Magan, a few kilometers west of Yakutsk, in Russia.

Until the early 1980s, Yakutsk/Magan was monitored as one of nine Arctic staging bases capable of handling the Tupolev Tu-22M (Backfire) bomber.

References

External links
 Airport Magan (Yakutsk) Aviateka.Handbook
 sever.aero 

Airports built in the Soviet Union
Airports in the Sakha Republic